Sichówek  is a village in the administrative district of Gmina Męcinka, within Jawor County, Lower Silesian Voivodeship, in south-western Poland.

The village has a population of 86.

References

Villages in Jawor County